Headway Devon is a local charity in Devon, England, which provides care, support, and rehabilitation for adults with acquired brain injuries. The organization is an independently registered charity affiliated to the national charity Headway.

The charity works to help clients and their families adjust to physical and psychological changes following brain injuries. Headway Devon provides social rehabilitation opportunities at Centre's in locations across Devon. The charity also employs a team of community support workers who visit clients in their own homes and communities.

Centre-based rehabilitation
The charity's approach to Centre-based brain injury rehabilitation is to provide what they consider a safe, relaxed, pressure-free environment with therapeutic activities, workshops and groups, and social contact for people recovering from a brain injury. Days at the Centre are also a source of respite for full-time careers. Before attendance at a Centre, an assessment is made and a care plan agreed, enabling staff to work towards mutual rehabilitation objectives. Centre attendance can help to renew meaningful daily activity, as well as offering an opportunity for social contact for those who have become isolated. Headway Devon Centre's are located in Exeter, Honiton, and South Devon.

Community support
Community support is a service with trained specialist staff working one-to-one with individuals in their homes and communities. The aim of community support is to maximize independent living skills and to facilitate social inclusion. This is typically achieved by providing help with housing issues, assisted shopping, budgeting, and contact with outside agencies. Community support can include any or all of these plus a wide variety of activities and tasks to help facilitate the rehabilitation process. When possible and appropriate, this includes a return to employment - paid or voluntary. Each community support programme is agreed with the individual and designed to meet their needs.

Headway Devon is managed by a Board of Trustees, which includes a number of client representatives. According to accounts published by the Charity Commission, the charity's income for the year to March 2008 was £578,727. This was raised through a mixture of grants from local social services, payments for services provided, and fundraising.

References

External links
 Website of Headway Devon
 Headway Devon YouTube Channel

Charities for disabled people based in England
Charities based in Devon
Health in Devon